This list of autonomous areas arranged by country gives an overview of autonomous areas of the world. An autonomous area is defined as an area of a country that has a degree of autonomy, or has freedom from an external authority. It is typical for it to be geographically distant from the country, or to be populated by a national minority. Countries that include autonomous areas are often federacies. The autonomous areas differ from federal units and independent states in the sense that they, in relation to the majority of other sub-national territories in the same country, enjoy a special status including some legislative powers, within the state (for a detailed list of federated units, see federated state).

This list includes areas that are internationally recognized, as well as some that are generally unrecognized.,  The definition of an autonomous area varies from country to country, so the native term as defined by the respective country's government is listed, and the English translation of the term is included.

Autonomous areas

Created by international agreements 

Notes:

, Norway: Although it does not fit the definition of autonomous area (not possessing partial internal sovereignty), Svalbard has the sovereignty of Norway limited by the Spitsbergen Treaty of 1920 and therefore is considered as having special status (as it is considered fully integrated with Norway, and not a dependency, it is a sui generis case).
 Heligoland, Germany: Although it is part of a German state, Schleswig-Holstein, it has been excluded of some European Union normatives, such as customs union and the Value Added Tax Area.
 Büsingen am Hochrhein, Germany and  Campione d'Italia, Italy  despite being integral parts of their respective countries, these two enclaves of Switzerland predominantly use Swiss franc as currency and are in customs union with it.

Created by internal statutes

Dependent and associated territories with autonomy

All sub-national regions are autonomous

Other entities called "autonomous"
A number of entities are also officially called "autonomous", though they do not have an exceptional freedom from external authority, and would not fall under the definition of autonomous area. They are listed here for clarity.

Capitals called "autonomous"

Independent cities called "autonomous"

Self-declared entities called "autonomous"

See also
 Autocephaly
 Autonomous administrative division
 Federated state
 List of administrative divisions by country
 List of countries and inhabited areas
 List of dependent territories
 List of leaders of dependent territories
 List of national capitals serving as administrative divisions
 List of sovereign states

Notes
 For example: 
 See International recognition of Kosovo for states that do and do not recognize the Republic of Kosovo.

References

External links 
 Autonomy World Map

Country
Country